"I've Got It Made" is a song written by Max D. Barnes, and recorded by American country music artist John Anderson.  It was released in November 1993 as the third single from his album Solid Ground.  The song reached number 3 on the Billboard Hot Country Singles & Tracks chart and number 19 on the Canadian RPM Country Tracks chart.

In August 2020, Josh Turner recorded a cover version of "I've Got It Made" featuring Anderson on duet vocals on his album, Country State of Mind.

Chart performance

Year-end charts

References

1993 singles
1993 songs
John Anderson (musician) songs
Josh Turner songs
Songs written by Max D. Barnes
Song recordings produced by James Stroud
BNA Records singles